Cronulla-Caringbah Junior Rugby League Football Club is a junior and amateur rugby league football club that was formed in 1952 and competes in the Cronulla-Sutherland District Rugby Football League; the junior side of the club was formed in 1963 to coincide with the formation of the CSDJRFL. The club is based out of Woolooware where its headquarters are located and usually draws on the large majority of its junior players from that suburb and the surrounding areas of Caringbah and Cronulla.
President Todd Ganderton, Secretary Daryl Gleeson.

The Cronulla-Caringbah club currently field teams from Under 6 age groups all the way up to A Grade.

2020 Sydney Shield Premiership 
In 2020, the Sydney Shield competition was suspended in March due to the COVID-19 pandemic in Australia. The competition was reorganised with several clubs dropping out, and Cronulla-Caringbah and Helensburgh Tigers joining. The competition recommenced in July, with results from the one round played in March annulled. The Sharks finished the nine-round regular season in second place with six wins, two losses and a bye. Cronulla-Caringbah defeated Belrose 32-12 in an elimination semi-final at Leichhardt Oval on September 19.

The Grand Final was held at Bankwest Stadium on 27 September 2020. The Sharks' opponents, Ryde-Eastwood Hawks started strongly, and went to a 26 to nil lead within the first 30 minutes of play. The Sharks responded with two converted tries in the last ten minutes of the first half, which ended with the score 26-12. In the second half, Cronulla-Caringbah scored the next two tries, narrowing the margin to 26-20. Ryde-Eastwood countered with an unconverted try to extend their lead to ten points. The Sharks responded with two converted tries in the last six minutes to snatch the Premiership, 32 to 30 being the full-time score.

2007 season 
The Cronulla Caringbah Sharks had another successful season in 2007 with 5 teams winning their respective Grand Finals.

The 2007 Premiership winning teams were : 
 Under 10B's Sharks 36 - 6 Gymea Gorilla's
 Under 11B's Sharks 12 - 4 Gymea Gorilla's
 Under 13A's Sharks 26 - 4 Gymea Gorilla's
 Under 17's Sharks 30 - 12 Gymea Gorilla's - *UNDER 17's Grand Final Photos 
 Under 19's Sharks 30 - 22 De La Salle. -  *UNDER 19's Grand Final Photos 
 UNDER 14A's Grand Final Photos

Notable players

See also

External links
Official website
LeagueNet Cronulla-Caringbah website

References 

Rugby league teams in Sydney
Junior rugby league
Rugby clubs established in 1952
1952 establishments in Australia
Cronulla, New South Wales